Matthias Deyle is a German film producer.

Filmography
 The Amorous Adventures of a Young Postman, (1970)
 Hanna von acht bis acht, (1983)
 Kinder unseres Volkes, (1983)
 Abwärts, (1984)
 The Lightship, (1985)
 Die Küken kommen, (1985)
 Der Junge mit dem Jeep, (1986)
 Hatschipuh, (1987)
 Sentimental Journey, (1987)
 Pizza-Express, (1988)
 Rosamunde, (1990)
 Aus heiterem Himmel, (1995)
 Die Sexfalle, (1997)
 Polizeiruf 110, (1996-8)
 Luftpiraten - 113 Passagiere in Todesangst, (2000)
 The Calling, (2000)
 Slap Her... She's French, (executive, 2002)
 K-19: The Widowmaker, (2002)
 The Quiet American, (2002)
 Terminator 3: Rise of the Machines, (2003)
 Alexander, (2004)
 The Aviator, (2004)
 Dead Fish, (2005)
 Basic Instinct 2, (2006)
 RV, (2006)

References 

German film producers